Stephen Eugene Hovley (born December 18, 1944) is a retired American professional baseball player whose career extended for eight seasons, including all or parts of five years in Major League Baseball for the Seattle Pilots / Milwaukee Brewers (1969–70), Oakland Athletics (1970–71) and Kansas City Royals (1972–73).

Born in Ventura, California, Hovley attended Stanford University and was selected by the California Angels in the 35th round (665th overall) of the 1966 Major League Baseball Draft. After two seasons in the Angels' farm system, he was chosen by the Pilots in the 1968 Major League Baseball expansion draft—also with the 35th pick. The Pilots loaned Hovley to the Triple-A Rochester Red Wings for the first two months of their inaugural  season before recalling him in June. In his third big-league game, Hovley collected three hits against his former team, the Angels, on June 27. His hot start in the Majors continued for his first two-dozen games, as he reached a season-high .352 batting average on July 24, with ten multi-hit games. But Hovley eventually cooled off and he ended the year with a .277 batting mark, three home runs and 20 RBI in 91 games played. He was a roommate of veteran pitcher Jim Bouton's, whose diary of the 1969 season, Ball Four, became a national sensation a year later. Hovley, like Bouton, was a non-conformist in the baseball world; according to Bouton, other players nicknamed Hovley "Orbie," shorthand for "Orbit."

Hovley got into 40 games and batted .281 with 16 RBI before being traded to Oakland on June 11 for Al Downing and Tito Francona. Relegated to part-time duty with the A's, Hovley hit only .173 in 141 at bats during his tenure, was sent to Triple-A in 1971, and then acquired by the Royals in the 1971 Rule 5 draft. He then played two years as the Royals' fourth outfielder, appearing in 105 and 104 games, to close out his Major League career with 263 hits (39 doubles, five triples and eight home runs), 88 RBI and a .258 batting average in 436 games played.

References

External links

1944 births
Living people
Baseball players from California
Iowa Oaks players
Kansas City Royals players
Major League Baseball outfielders
Milwaukee Brewers players
Oakland Athletics players
People from Ventura, California
Rochester Red Wings players
San Jose Bees players
Seattle Angels players
Seattle Pilots players
Sportspeople from Ventura County, California
Stanford Cardinal baseball players